Charles Bryson Simonton (September 8, 1838 – June 10, 1911) was an American politician and a member of the United States House of Representatives for the 9th congressional district of Tennessee.

Biography
Simonton was born in Tipton County, Tennessee, son of William and Catherine "Katie" Ferguson Simonton. He graduated from Erskine College in Due West, South Carolina in August 1859. He married Mary Andros "Minnie" McDill on October 16, 1866. He had five children, Anna Simonton, Ella Simonton, William McDill Simonton, Charles Pressley Simonton, and Nannie May Simonton.

Career
Simonton enlisted as a private in Company C, Ninth Tennessee Infantry, Confederate Army in 1861. He subsequently became second lieutenant, and then captain. He was severely wounded during the Battle of Perryville on October 8, 1862 and disabled from any further active duty during the war. He was elected clerk of the circuit court of Tipton County in March 1870.

Simonton read law, and was admitted to the bar in 1873. He then commenced practice in Covington, Tennessee in Tipton County. He was also a member of the Tennessee House of Representatives from 1877 to 1879. He became the editor of the Tipton Record in Covington, Tennessee.

Elected as a Democrat to the Forty-sixth and Forty-seventh Congresses, Simonton served from March 4, 1879 to March 3, 1883.  He was chairman of the Democratic state convention in 1886.

Simonton was president of the Covington city school board from 1892 to 1903. He was the United States district attorney for the Western district of Tennessee from 1895 to 1898.

Death
Simonton died in Covington, Tennessee, and is interred at Munford Cemetery.

References

External links

 
 

Democratic Party members of the Tennessee House of Representatives
1838 births
1911 deaths
Erskine College alumni
Democratic Party members of the United States House of Representatives from Tennessee
19th-century American politicians
American lawyers admitted to the practice of law by reading law
United States Attorneys for the Western District of Tennessee